Double check may refer to:

Double check, a chess term; check delivered by two pieces simultaneously
Double Check, a sculpture by John Seward Johnson II
Double Check (novel), a novel in the Traces series
Double-checked locking, a software design pattern
Double check valve, a backflow prevention design